The Salvadoran Football Champion is the winner of the El Salvador National Football Championship (1926–1968) or the Liga Mayor (1969 to present) of football in El Salvador.

Currently, there are two champions each calendar year with one champion for the Apertura season and one for the Clausura season.

Short Tournament (1926–1946)
Three regional champions, faced each other in the national championship. Each team represented a different section of the country (West zone, Central zone, East zone).

* - There was no national championship held during this year, only regional championships. These championships are now often considered national titles.

League System (1947–1997)

** - No national championship was held during these years

Apertura/Clausura format (1999-present)

(*) The first winner of the shorter tournament has been deemed "Champion Cup", and the next, that of the Clausura 1999, as "champions". The First Division of El Salvador has not changed that status competition.

Performance by club

See also 
Primera División de Fútbol Profesional

Football competitions in El Salvador
El Salvador